Jammie L. Robinson (born January 24, 2001) is an American football safety. He played college football at South Carolina and Florida State.

Early life and high school
Robinson grew up in Cordele, Georgia, and attended Lee County High School. He was rated a four-star recruit and committed to play college football at South Carolina over offers from Auburn, Kentucky, and Tennessee.

College career
Robinson began his career at South Carolina. He was named a starter for the Gamecocks enter ing his freshman year and was named to the Southeastern Conference (SEC) All-Freshman team. Robinson had 74 tackles with two tackles for loss, four passes broken up, and one interception as a sophomore. Robinson transferred to Florida State in 2021. He lead the Seminoles with 85 tackles and four interceptions in his first season with the team.

References

External links

Florida State Seminoles bio
South Carolina Gamecocks bio

Living people
Florida State Seminoles football players
South Carolina Gamecocks football players
Players of American football from Georgia (U.S. state)
American football safeties
2001 births